The 2019–20 San Francisco Dons men's basketball team represented the University of San Francisco during the 2019–20 NCAA Division I men's basketball season. The Dons, led by first-year head coach Todd Golden, played their home games at the War Memorial Gymnasium or the Chase Center as members of the West Coast Conference. They finished the season 22–12, 9–7 in WCC play to finish in fifth place. They defeated Loyola Marymount in the second round and Pacific in the third round to advance to the semifinals of the WCC tournament where they lost to Gonzaga.

Previous season
The Dons finished the 2018–19 season 21–10, 9–7 in WCC play to finish in fourth place. They lost in the Third Round to Pepperdine of the WCC tournament. Despite having 21 wins and a better record they were not invited to a postseason tournament.

On March 27, Kyle Smith left for San Francisco to accept the head coach position at Washington State. He finished with a five year record of 63–40 with two CBI appearances.  The Dons promoted assistant Todd Golden to head coaching position the following day.

Offseason

Departures

Incoming transfers

2019 recruiting class

Roster

Schedule and results

|-
!colspan=12 style=| Non-conference regular season

|-
!colspan=12 style=| WCC regular season

|-
!colspan=9 style=| WCC tournament

Source:

References

San Francisco Dons men's basketball seasons
San Francisco
San Francisco Dons
San Francisco Dons
2019 in San Francisco
2020 in San Francisco